The 2017–18 Georgian Superliga is the 18th season of the Georgian Superliga since its establishment.

Dinamo Tbilisi retained the title.

Teams
Delta joined the competition, expanding it to nine teams as no team was relegated from the previous season.

Regular season

Playoffs
Quarterfinals were played in a best-of-three games format, while semifinals and final in a best-of-five (2-2-1) format.

Relegation playoffs
Titebi played legs 2 and 3 at home and promoted to Superliga.

|}

References

External links
Official Georgian Basketball Federation website

Georgian Superliga seasons
Georgia
Superliga